Soyuz T-6 was a human spaceflight to Earth orbit to the Salyut 7 space station in 1982. Along with two Soviet cosmonauts, the crew included a Frenchman, Jean-Loup Chrétien.

The Soyuz-T spacecraft arrived at Salyut 7 following launch on 24 June 1982 and one day of solo operations. During the T-6 mission's time docked to the station, the crew performed joint Soviet-French experiments, including cardiovascular echography, alongside the station's resident crew.

Crew

Backup crew

Mission parameters
Mass: 6850 kg
Perigee: 189 km
Apogee: 233 km
Inclination: 51.7°
Period: 88.7 minutes

Mission highlights

Soyuz T-6 launched from the Baikonur Cosmodrome on 24 June 1982 at 16:29 GMT. Docking with the Salyut 7 station was completed manually after problems arose with the spacecraft's onboard automatic docking systems.

Once aboard Salyut 7, the crew completed joint Soviet-French, including echography and antibiotic experiments, with the station's resident crew, the crew of Soyuz T-5.

The mission transported the first French astronaut, Jean-Loup Chrétien, into space. While aboard the station, the resident crew afforded him the opportunity to eject Salyut 7's weekly bag of waste into space through the station's small trash airlock. Valentin Lebedev, writing in his diary, quoted Chrétien as saying Salyut 7 "is simple, doesn't look impressive, but is reliable."

References

Crewed Soyuz missions
Spacecraft launched in 1982
1982 in the Soviet Union
France–Soviet Union relations